Connelsville is an unincorporated community in Nineveh Township, Adair County, Missouri, United States. The community is on Missouri Route 149 about three miles north of Novinger and eight miles northwest of Kirksville. Shuteye Creek flows past the north side of the town and its confluence with the Chariton River is about one mile to the east.

Demographics

History
Connelsville was laid out in 1902 next to the older town of Nineveh, soon after the railroad was extended to that point. The community's name is a transfer from Connellsville, Pennsylvania. A post office was established at Connelsville in 1902, and remained in operation until 1937.

References

Unincorporated communities in Adair County, Missouri
1902 establishments in Missouri
Unincorporated communities in Missouri